Kitson Yang Wing-kit (born 1982) is a Hong Kong politician who is the elected Legislative Council member for Kowloon Central.

Though Hong Kong medical schools teach in English, Yang in July 2022 criticized a program that recruits doctors from medical schools outside of Hong Kong, for requiring that English be the language of instruction.

In January 2023, Yang said he would stage a protest to oppose building public housing in Kai Tak. On 1 February 2023, Yang said that the public housing might block views for those living in private apartment complexes. On 8 February 2023, Yang was the only person out of 35 lawmakers who did not vote in support of the plan to build public housing on the site; he cast a blank vote.

In March 2023, Mok Kin-shing said of Yang "We can see that even the legislator who had said he would organise protests to oppose the scheme now has made a U-turn and supported the scheme," as analysts said that John Lee would aim for "all votes yes" to show Beijing his leadership, with one lawmaker saying "Probably the central government is concerned about Hong Kong's housing problem and that the government does not want to see more opposing views at Legco."

Electoral history

References 

Living people
1982 births
District councillors of Kowloon City District
HK LegCo Members 2022–2025
Members of the Election Committee of Hong Kong, 2012–2017
Hong Kong pro-Beijing politicians